Clarence Charles Lewis Jordon (31 May 1909 – 30 October 1965) was an Australian rules footballer who played with Richmond in the Victorian Football League (VFL).

Family
The son of Patrick Jordon (1884-1949), and Susan Jordon (1886-1956), née Stirling, Clarence Charles Lewis Jordon was born at Carlton, Victoria on 31 May 1909.

He married Ada Walters in 1934. Their son, Raymond Clarence "Slug" Jordon (1937-2012), was a Victorian cricketer, an Australian Rules footballer, and a successful Australian Rules coach.

Death
He died at South Melbourne, Victoria on 30 October 1965.

Notes

References
 
 Hogan P: The Tigers Of Old, Richmond FC, (Melbourne), 1996. 
 World War Two Nominal Roll: Leading Aircraftman Clarence Charles Lewis Jordon (119235), Department of Veterans' Affairs.
 A9301, 119235: World War Two Service Record: Leading Aircraftman Clarence Charles Lewis Jordon (119235), National Archives of Australia.

External links 

Clarrie Jordon's playing statistics from The VFA Project

1909 births
1965 deaths
Australian rules footballers from Melbourne
Richmond Football Club players
Prahran Football Club players
People from Carlton, Victoria